Marun Petrochemical Complex (M.P.C.), is a petrochemical complex in Mahshahr, Khuzestan, Iran which was established in 21 Jan 1995.

The complex consists of low-density polyethylene (LDPE), high-density polyethylene, polyphenol, olefin, ethylene oxide/ethylene glycol and ultrasonic testing plants.
The main plant is Olefin which feeds the others.
Each plant has its own license. For example the license for LDPE plant is from Stamicarbon (Sabic).

See also

National Iranian Petrochemical Company

External links
Marun Petrochemical Co.

Oil refineries in Iran